Jessa Gamble (born April 25, 1979), née Sinclair, is a Canadian and English author and co-owner of the science blog The Last Word on Nothing. Her book, The Siesta and the Midnight Sun: How Our Bodies Experience Time (Penguin Group), documents the rituals surrounding daily rhythms. Along with local languages and beliefs, these schedules are losing their global diversity and succumbing to what Gamble calls "circadian imperialism." The foreword was written by Canadian broadcaster Jay Ingram.

Work 

In recent years, Gamble has turned her attention to research on reducing the need for sleep  by making it more efficient and concentrated. She is a regular commentator on issues around sleep, such as the morality of sleep, Seasonal Affective Disorder, and cultural differences in daily rhythms.

Gamble's work has appeared in The Guardian, as well as Aeon Magazine, Scientific American, New Scientist, The Walrus
, The Atlantic, Canadian Geographic and Nature  magazines.

At TED Global 2011 in Oxford, England, Gamble spoke about the natural sleep cycle of humans, which includes a two-hour waking period in the middle of the night. , the talk had more than two and a half million views. 
 
While residing in Yellowknife, Northwest Territories, she worked as an editor at Up Here, the magazine about Canada's North, and served as writer in residence at the Yellowknife Public Library, mentoring local aspiring writers.

In September 2014, Palgrave Macmillan published her book collaboration with fund manager Guy Spier, "The Education of a Value Investor".

Reception 

The Canadian Science Writers Association bestowed a 2007 Science in Society journalism award for Gamble's first-person account of daily life at the Eureka High Arctic Weather Station. Her travelogue of a canoe trip through the Thelon Game Sanctuary on a quest for muskox was selected for inclusion in the Best Canadian Essays 2009 anthology and nominated for a National Magazine Award for Best Short Feature.

Writing about her in the acknowledgements, Spier wrote the following about Gamble:

″Without you, I never would have started this book because my fears of writing were simply too great. Upon first meeting you at TEDGlobal, I could see that you believed in my message and in this book even before I did. You alone sustained the idea of this book through our early conversations and interviews. You won the precious attention of William Clark, our agent. And, while I was quivering with fear, it was your excellent book proposal that brought us into the hands of Palgrave Macmillan and Laurie Harting. Even once we started, there were many more moments than I care to remember when, had it not been for your constant and quiet encouragement, I might not have stuck with it. And your calming presence at our early morning writing sessions was instrumental in giving me the courage to face up to my terror and put pen to paper. But more than anything, thanks for your friendship and loyalty to me and to the book through the various changes and transformations of the project. Thanks also to your son, Oliver, for having parted with you during your visits to Zurich.″

One of her articles on the subject won the 2014 Best Feature award at the Science Writers' Awards for Britain and Ireland.

References

External links
 

Canadian science writers
Canadian bloggers
Canadian women journalists
Canadian women non-fiction writers
English emigrants to Canada
University of Toronto alumni
Science journalists
1979 births
Living people
Canadian women bloggers
Women science writers
Writers from Yellowknife
Lisgar Collegiate Institute alumni
British bloggers
British women bloggers
21st-century British non-fiction writers
21st-century British women writers
21st-century Canadian journalists
21st-century British journalists
British science journalists